National Highway 505A, commonly referred to as NH 505A is a national highway in  India. It is a spur road of National Highway 5. NH-505A traverses the state of Himachal Pradesh in India.

Route 
Powari - Reckong Peo - Kalpa.

Junctions  

  Terminal near Powari.

See also 

 List of National Highways in India
 List of National Highways in India by state

References

External links 

 NH 505A on OpenStreetMap

National highways in India
National Highways in Himachal Pradesh